Menudo is a Puerto Rican boy band that was formed in Puerto Rico by producer Edgardo Díaz. Referred to as the "Most Iconic Latino Pop Music Band", Menudo has been ranked as one of the Biggest Boy Bands of All Time by several publications, including Billboard, Us Weekly, Seventeen, and Teen Vogue, being the only Latin band on their lists.

The band had several radio hits during its course. They acted in a television film (1979's Leyenda de Amor) and two feature films, Una aventura llamada Menudo and Menudo: La Película, in a telenovela named "Quiero Ser" and a television mini-series named Panchito y Arturo.

Menudo's original line-up consisted of (5 boys) two sets of brothers: Fernando and Nefty Sallaberry (ages 12 and 13); and the Melendez brothers, Carlos Meléndez, (age 12), Óscar Meléndez, (age 11), and Ricky Meléndez, (age 9); the latter three are Díaz's cousins. The band's golden-era lineup consisted of members Ricky Meléndez, Johnny Lozada, René Farrait, Miguel Cancel, Xavier Serbiá, Charlie Masso and Ray Reyes. It was also a starting point for popular international stars like Ricky Martin (1984–89) and Draco Rosa (1984–87), who were members of the band in the mid-1980s.

As the group entered the 1990s, and their popularity started to wane, allegations of drug use and sexual abuse accusations against Díaz started to surface. In 1997, the rights and the name Menudo were sold. The remaining members continued to perform as MDO until their official disbandment in 2002. However, this iteration has continued to perform sporadically since. New management of Menudo formed a new line-up in 2007, releasing an EP but disbanding in 2009. Some of the members of the "golden era" of the band reunited in 1998 under the name El Reencuentro and in 2019 for the  "Súbete a Mi Moto Tour".

Menudo is estimated to have sold 20 million albums worldwide and have generated over 300 million US dollars.

History

The beginning and rise to fame
Menudo was formed in 1977 by music producer Edgardo Díaz. The original line up consisted of 5 members, the Sallaberry brothers, Fernando and Nefty, and Díaz's cousins, the Melendez brothers, Oscar, Carlos, and Ricky. They were signed to Padosa Records and released their first album Los Fantasmas in 1977. It featured Enséñame a cantar, a song by Spanish singer Micky. In 1978 they released another album called "Laura". Fifteen-year-old Nefty was the very first member to leave and was replaced by 12-year-old René Farrait. In 1979, they released an album called Chiquitita. At the end of 1979, Carlos left the band at age 15 and was replaced by 12-year-old Johnny Lozada, after which they made their first Christmas album, "Felicidades".

In the early 1980s, Menudo had several hits, including "Los Fantasmas" and a cover version of ABBA's "Voulez-Vous". They filmed three music videos for the song "Chiquitita", including one with Puerto Rican music star Ednita Nazario (who sang with them and played the titular "Chiquitita" on the video). The group then released several moderately successful albums, including Fuego (Fire), which yielded hits "Ella A-A" ("Her"), "Fuego" ("Fire"), and "A Bailar" ("To Dance"). They also made "Fui Hecho Para Amarte", which itself was also a cover, in that song's case of KISS's '"I Was Made For Lovin' You", but that song was not included in "Fuego", and was released on their "Xanadu" album instead.

During 1981, the group, which by then consisted of René Farrait (14), Johnny Lozada (13), Xavier Serbiá (13), Miguel Cancel (13), and remaining original member Ricky Melendez (13), released "Quiero Ser" (I Want to Be). The album would launch Menudo into international stardom. It included hit songs such as "Quiero Ser" ("I Want to Be"), "Súbete A Mi Moto" ("Get on My Motorcycle"), "Rock En La TV" ("Rock on TV"),  "Claridad" ("Clarity"), and "Mi Banda Toca Rock" ("My Band Plays Rock"). They also had their own telenovela series entitled Quiero Ser.

That same year, the group hosted a television show on Telemundo entitled Gente Joven de Menudo. They hosted a yearly beauty pageant, "La chica joven de Menudo", ("Menudo's young girl") and the winner of the pageant would sometimes appear in the band's videos or join them onstage at their concerts in the United States.

Menudo became very popular throughout Latin America, from Mexico to Argentina, and Brazil. They also became the first boy band to own their own private jet. Díaz, their manager, purchased a Lockheed JetStar that had belonged to American President Richard Nixon and the Shah of Iran. He had Menudo's name emblazoned on both sides of the fuselage.

In 1982, Charlie Masso, then age 12, replaced René Farrait, age 15. Masso's first album with Menudo was Por Amor (For Love). During this boom of popularity, fans started calling themselves contagious to the "Menuditis", similar to Beatlemania and Bieber Fever, or the "Menudomania". They were so popular that they starred in their own feature films: Menudo: La Pelicula and Una Aventura Llamada Menudo. Aventura starred Gladys Rodríguez as "Señora Mía" and included songs such as "Clara" and "A Volar" ("Fly").

During their first visit to New York in early 1983, Ray Reyes, 13, replaced Xavier Serbiá, 15. Their American fanbase grew, especially among the young, as evidenced by Menudo on ABC, a
series of four minute music spots that aired during the Fall 1983 season of ABC's youth-oriented Saturday-morning programming block. They also sang the theme song for ABC's Rubik, the Amazing Cube. Miguel Cancel became the first member to voluntarily quit the group. According to a 1998 interview, he was unhappy that a sudden voice change rendered him unable to sing his songs, so he opted to leave before his scheduled departure. He was replaced by Roy Rosselló, 13. Menudo signed a six-year multimillion-dollar contract with RCA International and released their Spanish album A Todo Rock (Full of Rock). According to Time magazine, at the end of July, the group had already sold 3 million copies worldwide, 750,000 in USA only.

Around this time, Menudo merchandise began to be mass-produced. Merchandise included Menudo dolls, which appeared in the United States and Latin American toy markets in 1984, Menudo Topps trading cards, wristwatches, fotonovelas, fanzines, T-shirts, a 1981 board game named "Menudo Karshow" and other clothing accessories and school supplies.

In 1984, Robby Rosa (now known as Draco Rosa), 14, replaced Johnny Lozada, 16, just in time for Menudo to release their first English-language album, Reaching Out, which featured the theme track "Like a Cannonball" for the Hollywood movie Cannonball Run 2; and their first Portuguese album, Mania, both featuring versions of some of their Spanish hits. During the first half of 1984, Menudo toured the U.S. and Brazil. The Spanish version "Como Cannonball" was used in the Filipino youth movie Bagets 2 and also featured the song "Fly Away".

On September 16, 1984, Ricky Melendez, 16, the sole remaining original member, left the group. Up until then, he was the only Menudo member to remain with the group for seven years. He was replaced by Ricky Martin, then 12, who debuted on the album, Evolución (Evolution). During this time, Menudo's popularity reached parts of Asia including Japan and the Philippines, and the group made English-language commercials for Pepsi, Scope, Burger King, McDonald's, and Crest. They also made a guest appearance on the popular American children's program Sesame Street. By the end of September, sales of their records suprass 8 million copies worldwide. Then, much to the surprise of fans and himself, Ray Reyes, 15, departed the group earlier than expected, due to internal conflicts between Ray's father and the manager (information recently confirmed by his brother Raúl Reyes). In a 1998 interview, Reyes stated he was surprised when during a Menudo interview in 1985, the interviewer asked who would leave the group next and Edgardo Díaz named Ray. The group also had a weekly television show called "Menudo Mania".

Raymond Acevedo (13) took over Reyes' spot in 1985 and Menudo sang vocals for the Spanish-English song "Cantare, Cantaras" (I Will Sing, You Will Sing) with various Latin artists to raise money for UNICEF. This song was the Latin American version of "We Are the World". "Cantare, Cantaras" was recorded on April 9, 1985, at the A&M Studios. The group released their second English-language album, Menudo which contains the songs "Hold Me" (#62 Billboard Hot 100, RCA 14087) and "Explosion", both with lead vocals by Robi Rosa. They also released their next Spanish album, Ayer Y Hoy (Yesterday And Today), and their second Portuguese album A Festa Vai Comecar (The Party Is Going To Start). They successfully toured Brazil, performing before hundreds of thousands of fans, but there were allegations of the tour being poorly organized: the capacity for a concert in Rio de Janeiro was 60,000 but 70,000 tickets were sold, and 2 women died. In São Paulo, a 100,000-capacity stadium was sold-out with 200,000 people, and in the São Paulo city of Campinas, rain delayed a concert for 4 hours.

In 1986, the song King Holiday was recorded. Later in the year Roy Rosselló (16) was replaced by Sergio Blass (13) but no farewell concert was held.  According to a book written by Raymond Acevedo's father in 2012 titles "Papi, Quiero Ser Un Menudo," Roy threatened to expose management irregularities to the press and was given a huge sum of money to leave the group due to his behavior as it was deemed by creator Edgardo Diaz as "uncontrollable." At this time, Menudo's management started bending the rules a little and started allowing members to remain in the group after reaching the age limit. Sergio had been in two Puerto Rican groups prior to joining Menudo; the first being Concepto Juvenil from 1983 to 1985, and then Los Chicos de Puerto Rico, for a few months in 1985. The group released several albums that year, starting with their only Italian album, Viva! Bravo!, which they showcased in Italy in the San Remo Music Festival. The Spanish album Refrescante (Refreshing), the English album Can't Get Enough, and the Portuguese album Menudo followed respectively, then came tours of the U.S., Latin America (including Brazil), and the Philippines.

Internal conflicts and image change
In January 1987, Ralphy Rodriguez (13) replaced Charlie (17) just as the group began facing internal conflicts. First, Robby (17) quit without warning in the midst of a Brazilian tour, becoming the third member to quit voluntarily. Apparently, he had written a song and presented the idea to management and they turned him down, supposedly mocking him, which prompted him to leave. Robbie's lawyer prevented them from using his song. Also, the group was dropped from RCA International due to low record sales, so they signed a contract with Melody International Mexico. Charlie was asked to return to the group to complete the Brazilian tour and to embark on the Summer in the Street U.S. tour and introduce new member Rubén Gómez (14).

At this point, the group underwent a complete image makeover, changing their look to a rougher, more rugged, rock-n-roll-like look. Ralphy, Ruben, Ricky Martin, Sérgio e Raymond: this formation became known as "Los Hijos Del Rock". Their music, formerly described as bubblegum-pop, underwent a similar change. They released the Spanish album Somos Los Hijos del Rock (We Are The Sons Of Rock), followed by an English-Tagalog album for the Philippines titled In Action with Ralphy and Rubén. In late 1987, Ralphy's parents pulled him from the group, citing improper treatment by management; this eventually came to light in 1991 with accusations of a Menudo sex scandal. Charlie was again asked to fill in during the Philippines tour, which would be their last as their popularity there waned.

In early 1988, Angelo García (12) replaced Ralphy Rodríguez (14) and they released their final English-language album, Sons of Rock, scoring an international hit, "You Got Potential". Another song, "TLC", featured lead vocals by Ricky Martin. In August 1988, Raymond Acevedo's contract was about to expire, but he decided to leave before auditions were held for his replacement, and Menudo performed as a quartet for a few months before Robert Avellanet (13) took over. The album Sombras Y Figuras was released at the end of the year.

During 1989, longtime member Ricky Martin (17) left the group to pursue a solo career. Rawy Torres (13) years old, replaced him and the formation Los Ultimos Heroes was born and they released the album Los Ultimos Heroes. This formation was a success. They filmed a telenovela of the same name. Future member Jonathan Montenegro acted alongside them.

1990s
Despite their newfound success, the group kept facing problems: At age 14 during a concert in Caracas, Venezuela, Angelo García left the stage because of the pain of appendicitis; the new member was chosen by Sergio's mother and he was César Abreu (13), who only lasted 7 months. Like Sergio, Abreu was in Concepto Juvenil, from 1989 to early 1990. They released another Portuguese album, Menudo: Edicion Brasil.

Before Abreu left, management was preparing for Sergio's departure and the debut of the first non-Puerto Rican member, Adrián Olivares (13) of Mexico, but Abreu's exit delayed Sergio's departure. Management decided to keep Sergio for another Spanish album, No Me Corten El Pelo (Don't Cut My Hair) featuring the Sergio/Rubén/Robert/Rawy/Adrián lineup. During this time, Menudo: Edicion Brasil was renamed to Os Ultimos Herois and re-recorded Cesar's songs with Adrian's vocals and an additional track sung by Robert Avellanet.

In October 1990, two members were arrested at Miami International Airport, Sergio Blass and Ruben Gomez, ages 18 and 16, after a sniffer dog found marijuana in their pockets. It would have been acquired in Mexico while touring with Menudo.

In December, two new non-Puerto Rican members joined the group: Edward Aguilera (12) of Spain replaced Sergio Blass (17) (thus becoming the second European-after Fernando Salaberry-to be a member of the band) and Jonathan Montenegro (12) of Venezuela replaced Rubén Gómez (16).

At the end of 1990, with the resignation of Ruben Gomez and Sérgio Blass and the entry of the two new members, a new controversy arose: five of its members, Adrian Olivares, Jonathan Montenegro, Edward Aguilera, Rawy Torres and Robert Avellanet resign from Menudo, alleged abuse and mistreatment.  This lineup lasted very little, from December 1990 to April 1991, and they didn't go on tour or record any albums.

Adrian Olivares was the only one who remained in the group after he was approached while in Mexico and also was paid the money owed to him. The Management proposed a new lineup with a more international focus and Adrian wanting to be the oldest in the group accepted to come back.

Edgardo Díaz left Puerto Rico and held auditions in Miami, Florida, signing Miami teens Alexis Grullón (13), Ashley Ruiz (15), and Andy Blázquez (12), and Pecos, Texas resident Abel Talamántez (13). This formation became known as the A-Team, because all the members started their name with the letter A.

The first album with the new lineup was Detrás De Tu Mirada, which was very successful in the whole continent, especially in Peru. From then on, the Peruvian fanbase was the most important one.

Menudo continued to work, releasing an English single titled Dancin', Movin', Shakin', and a follow-up in 1993, Cosmopolitan Girl, the first of several English albums on McGillis Records. They also continued to travel through Latin America.

In March 1992, Menudo filmed in New York City "The Making of Dancin, Movin, Shakin" for Darrin McGillis Productions. In August 2012, the film was released for free viewing on YouTube.

In 1992, they released 15 Años (15 Years), which would be Adrián's last album with the band (he decided to leave in 1993). According to his words in a recent interview, he fled to Miami without anyone seeing and left the group without speaking to the administration. He was missing for 3 days, until he decided to let them know that he would not come back. The album had hits such as “Buscame” and “Lo  Que Juramos”. Ricky López (13) replaced Adrián (16) and the group released their 5th Portuguese album Vem Pra Mim (Come To Me) (1993). The album was promoted for a short bit of time and most of their appearances on Portuguese TV were without Ricky or introducing him to the group.

The next year, they released their 22nd Spanish album, Imaginate... (Imagine), with hits like “Un Hombre Que Sabia Demas”, which is the Spanish version of “Um Homem Que Sabia Demais” from Skank, “Yo Quiero Bailar Reggae”, and “Mil Angeles”, which was dedicated to a fan, Cecilia Lopez, who died at one of their concerts in Peru the year before.

In 1995, Ricky López (15) quit the group without warning, and again the band performed as a quartet for a few months. Ashley (19) had also decided to leave, so auditions were held and Didier Hernández (16) and Anthony Galindo (16) were chosen. Ashley's farewell concert was in Panama, where the new members were presented.

In 1996, the group released their last Spanish album under the Menudo name, Tiempo De Amar (Time To Love). The album was very successful, producing several hit singles. In 1997, the rights and the name Menudo were sold and the band changed the name to MDO, at the time Andy Blázquez (18) was replaced by Daniel René Weider. A self-titled Spanish album was released, increasing the group's popularity in Latin America and the U.S. MDO has continued to release albums despite some changes in management (see main article: MDO.)

El Reencuentro
In 1998 Ricky Meléndez, René Farrait, Miguel Cancel, Johnny Lozada, Ray Reyes, and Charlie Massó re-joined to celebrate the 15th anniversary of their success in Latin America, North America, Spain, and several other countries. They planned the reunion concert to take place at Radio City Music Hall in New York, as an experimental project. The show sold out so quickly and the demand for more shows was so huge they had to change the venue for a bigger one. They ended up doing the shows at the Alliance Theatre in Atlanta, Georgia. They had an unexpected success and performed as an ensemble throughout North and Latin America until August 2015, when the group disbanded due to financial issues. They named this El Reencuentro because they couldn't use the "Menudo" name.

2000s
In 2000, MDO released their album Subir Al Cielo with critical success. The album lead track "Te Quise Olvidar" topped the Billboard Hot Latin Tracks for several weeks. The group follow-up singles "Sin Ti" and "Me Huele A Soledad" also reached the top 10 in the U.S..

In 2002, former members Sergio, Rubén, Robert, Angelo and Rawy reunited under the name "Los Últimos Héroes" giving numerous concerts in Venezuela.

In early 2003, MDO officially broke up on amicable terms. The members wanted to pursue other projects. Edgardo Díaz introduced the new MDO in January 2005.

In 2004, Edgardo Díaz announced that he would be bringing a new group with the Menudo formula into the music industry. Initially expecting this new group to be named Menudo, he surprised the press and general public by naming them Tick Tock.

Also in 2004, former Menudo members Roy, Raymond, Rubén, Sergio and Andy reunited under the name and banner: Menudo: La Reunion. They were based and focused primarily on a series of 'Brazilian' tours. Sergio left due to his prior commitment with "Los Últimos Héroes", and was replaced with Anthony Galindo. Andy would later be replaced by former MDO member Caleb Avilés before disbanding in late 2005, early 2006.

In January 2005, producer Edgardo Díaz introduced the new MDO with four new members: Daniel Rodríguez, Luis Montes, Elliot Suro, and Lorenzo Duarte. The first three were among the contestants of Puerto Rican reality/talent show Objetivo Fama. This latest incarnation of the group achieved great success with their single "Otra Vez" which took them all across Latin America.

Also, in 2005, former Menudo members René, Johnny, Miguel, Ricky, Charlie, and Ray reunited once again to perform the songs that Menudo popularized during their era under the name and banner El Reencuentro: Momento del Adios making this their farewell tour. There were plans to bring this production to Latin American and the U.S. Also in 2005, Sergio, Angelo, Robert, Rawy and Adrián reunited again under the name Los Últimos Héroes after their successful reunion concerts in 2002.

In 2006, former Menudo: La Reunion members, Anthony and Rubén reunited and formed the duo Blacksheep and continued touring in Brazil. The duo grew a large fan base in both Brazil and Hispanic America.

In 2007, a re-release of the 1992 VHS film of Menudo The making of Dancin', Movin', Shakin'" was released on McGillis Records. Entitled Triple Threat DVD/CD Combo, the box set included the Film on DVD for the first time, along with two music CDs, Latin Teen Stars and Dance Music All Night Long, featuring hit songs by Menudo, ex-Menudo members. The single, "Dancin', Movin', Shakin'", and "Cosmopolitan Girl" was released digitally on iTunes in May 2009.

2007–2009 lineup

In 2007, it was announced that Menudo would return after signing a multi-album contract with Sony Music. That would be directed by Johnny Wright, he was the manager of Justin Timberlake and the new band music will be a fusion of urban, pop and rock in both English and Spanish. They began promoting the project in cities of the United States and Mexico to attract young singers who wanted to belong to a new band that would sing in Spanish and English. Auditions in different cities such as Los Angeles, Dallas, Miami, New York, among others. In the Dallas audition, radio announcer Daniel Luna and singer Luis Fonsi were part of the selection jury. where they were selected JC Gonzalez and Monti Montañez (Che Antonio). In New York, they took 25 boys and during this one-week mini-competency they chose 15: Monti Montañez  (Che Antonio), JC Gonzalez, Carlos Pena, Jr., Anthony, Carlos Olivero, Chris Moy, Dennis, Eric, Hansel, Henry, Jorge Gabriel, Jorge Negron, José Bordonada, Monti Montañez (Che Antonio), Thomas and Trevor. The 15 semifinalists met in South Beach, Florida to continue preparing with producer Johnny Wright, choreograph Anibal Marrero and voice coach David Coury, participating through a reality show showing the entire process of competition. The re-founding of the band was profiled in a MTV reality series entitled Making Menudo that had launched as a primetime series on October 25, 2007, but was later pushed to afternoons due to low ratings.  The series aired ten episodes, ending on November 20, 2007.

The members chosen in this version were: Jose Bordonada Collazo, Chris Moy, Emmanuel Vélez Pagán, Monti Montañez (Che Antonio), and Carlos Olivero. In December, a few weeks after the members of the group were chosen, their More Than Words EP was released, including four songs: "More Than Words (A E I O U)," "Mas Que Amor (A E I O U)," "Move," and "This Christmas." Their first album was scheduled for release in autumn of 2008.

In 2009 they had a video in two versions titled: "Lost", in which the American actress, model and singer of Puerto Rican descent, Victoria Justice, appeared, which attracted much attention of the public towards the video. The group disbanded in early 2009.

2015–present
After having internal band problems, El Reencuentro disbanded in 2015 with Charlie Massó threatening to take legal action with Johnny Lozada, who at the time had the financial and managerial control of the project.

During 2016, four members of El Reencuentro René Farrait, Charlie Massó, Ray Reyes, Miguel Cancel and joined by Robert Avellanet went back on tour, this time under the name Menudo. However the project disbanded quickly and continued with the Menudomania Forever Tour produced by In Miami Productions formed by other Menudo and MDO members from different eras, including Avellanet, Jonathan Montenegro and Rawy Torres.

In 2019, Ricky Meléndez, Johnny Lozada, Miguel Cancel, Ray Reyes and René Farrait, reunited once again for the "Súbete a Mi Moto Tour" that kicked off at the Dunkin' Donuts Center and included dates in Latin America. It was later informed that Robert Avellanet was replacing Miguel Cancel for the remainder of the tour that is on hold due to the COVID-19 pandemic.

In September 2020, former Menudo and MDO member Anthony Galindo was found unconscious after attempting suicide. He died days later after remaining hospitalized and became the first Menudo member to pass away. His family described the singer's deep depression from the prolonged shutdown of various entertainment performance venues caused by the COVID-19 pandemic. His organs were donated in accordance with his last wish. Longtime member Ray Reyes died April 30, 2021, of a massive heart attack in Newark, New Jersey at 51. The group will finish its last time of the "Súbete A Mi Moto Tour" with members Ricky Meléndez, René Farrait, Johnny Lozada and Miguel Cancel.

2022 reboot 
It was announced during 2022, that a group of people, led by Mexican-American actor Mario Lopez, was to oversee a reboot of Menudo, starting the project, named "Menudo: A New Beginning", with auditions held online and in San Juan, Puerto Rico.

Band members

The following lists past Menudo members. Edgardo Díaz's group had a long list of members because the boys had to leave after turning a certain age, usually 16 years old.
{| class="wikitable"
|+
!Members
!Ages in
the group
!Years in
the group
!Status
!Replaced by
!Notes
|-
|Nefty Sallaberry
|13–15
|1977–79
|Retired
|René Farrait
|
|-
|Carlos Meléndez
|12–15
|1977–80
|Retired
|Johnny Lozada
|Brother of Oscar & Ricky and cousin of Edgardo Díaz
|-
|Fernando Sallaberry
|12–15
|1977–80
|Retired
|Xavier Serbia
|Born in Spain
|-
|Óscar Meléndez
|11–15
|1977–81
|Retired
|Miguel Cancel
|Brother of Carlos & Ricky and cousin of Edgardo Díaz
|-
|Ricky Meléndez
|9–16
|1977–84
|Active
|Ricky Martin
|Brother of Carlos & Oscar and cousin of Edgardo Díaz
|-
|René Farrait
|12–15
|1979–82
|Active
|Charlie Masso
|
|-
|Johnny Lozada
|12–16
|1980–84
|Active
|Robi Rosa
|
|-
|Xavier Serbia
|12–15
|1980–83
|Retired
|Ray Reyes
|Financial analyst on CNN en Español
|-
|Miguel Cancel
|13–15
|1981–83
|Active
|Roy Rossello
|Born in U.S.A. 
|-
|Charlie Massó
|12–17
|1982–87
|Retired
|Ralphy Rodríguez
|
|-
|Ray Reyes
|13–15
|1983–85
|Deceased
|Raymond Acevedo
|Grew too tall 
|-
|Roy Rosselló
|13–16
|1983–86
|Quit
|Sergio Blass
|
|-
|Robby Rosa
|14–17
|1984–87
|Quit
|Rubén Gómez
|Born in U.S.A.
|-
|Ricky Martin
|12–17
|1984–89
|Retired
|Rawy Torres
|
|-
|Raymond Acevedo Kercado
|13–16
|1985–88
|Quit
|Robert Avellanet
|
|-
|Sergio Gonzalez Ojeda (Sergio Blass)
|13–17
|1986–90
|Expelled
|Jonathan Montenegro
|Born in U.S.A.
|-
|Ralphy Rodríguez
|13–14
|1987–88
|Quit
|Angelo García
|
|-
|Rubén Gómez Kane
|13–16
|1987–90
|Expelled
|Edward Aguilera
|Born in U.S.A.
|-
|Angelo García
|12–14
|1988–90
|Quit
|César Abreu
|Born in U.S.A.
|-
|Robert Avellanet
|13–16
|1988–91
|Quit
|Alexis Grullón
|
|-
|Rawy Torres
|14–16
|1989–91
|Quit
|Ashley Ruiz
|
|-
|César Abreu
|13
|1990
|Quit
|Adrián Olivares
|
|-
|Adrián Olivares
|13–16
|1990–93
|Quit
|Ricky López
|Born in Mexico.
|-
|Edward Aguilera
|15–16
|1990–91
|Quit
|Andy Blázquez
|
|-
|Jonathan Montenegro
|12–13
|1990–91
|Quit
|Abel Talamántez
|Born in Venezuela.
|-
|Alexis Grullón
|13–23
|1991–2001
|Retired
|Member until disbandment
|Born in U.S.A. 
|-
|Ashley Ruiz
|15–19
|1991–95
|Quit
|Didier Hernández
|Born in U.S.A. 
|-
|Andy Blázquez
|12–18
|1991–97
|Quit
|Daniel René Weider
|
|-
|Abel Talamántez
|13–24
|1991–2002
|Retired
|Last member before disbandment'|First Mexican-American.
|-
|Ricky López
|13–15
|1993–95
|Retired
|Anthony Galindo
|Nicknamed 'Ricky III'.
|-
|Anthony Galindo
|16–21
|1995–2000
|Deceased
|Member until disbandment
|Born in Venezuela.
|-
|Didier Hernández
|16–22
|1995–2001
|Retired
|Member until disbandment
|Born in Cuba.
|-
|Daniel René Weider
|14–15
|1997–98
|Quit
| --
|Born in Venezuela.
|-
|José Bordonada Collazo
|15–17
|2007–09
|Quit
|Member until disbandment
|
|-
|José Montañez "Monti Montanez" now (Che Antonio)
|18–20
|2007–09
|Retired
|Member until disbandment
|
|-
|Chris Moy
|
|2007–09
|Quit
|Member until disbandment
|
|-
|Carlito Olivero
|18–20
|2007–09
|Retired
|Member until disbandment
|
|-
| Emmanuel Vélez Pagán
|
|2007–09
|Quit
|Member until disbandment
|
|}

Discography
 Studio albums 

 Live albums 

 Compilation albums 

Films and television
Unknown date 300 millones1977 El Show de Tommy
1977 Menudo – En Concierto 
1978 Noche de Gala
1979-mid 1980s La Gente Joven de Menudo
1981 Menudo: La Pelicula
1981 Quiero Ser (telenovela)
1980s Menudo Mania
1982 Es por Amor (Venezuelan Mini Soap Opera)
1982 Una Aventura Llamada Menudo
1983 Menudo on ABC
1983 Silver Spoons (TV Series)
1984 Sesame Street (TV Series)
1985 The Love Boat (TV Series)
1985 Solid Gold
1986 Menudo Video Explosion
1986 Por Siempre Amigos
1990 Los ultimos heroes (mini series)
1992  McGillis Records
2007 Making Menudo (TV Series)
2022 Menudo: Forever Young (Documentary Series) 

Specials
1982 A Ritmo Menudo with Karla Maria
1983 Contigo Xavier with Karla Maria
1986 King Holiday1989 Nueva Navidad1990 OptimismoSingles

Commercials
Comercial Thom McAn - (1981)

Series and movies
1979 Menudo – Leyenda De Amor – TV movie
1981 Menudo: La Pelicula
1982 Una Aventura Llamada Menudo
1992 
1987 Novel Por Siempre Amigos
1990 Serie Los Ultimos Heroes
2020 Serie Subete a Mi Moto

After years of planning and development, on September 17, 2020, it was announced that a TV series about the group titled Súbete A Mi Moto was set to premier on Amazon Prime Video. The series was released on October 9, 2020. The series focused the story from the perspective of Edgardo Díaz, founder and manager of the group.

2021: Menudo: Forever Young'' (Documentary)

In contrast to the “Súbete a Mi Moto” Series, launched in 2020, by the streaming platform, from Amazon Prime, which tells the story of the boy band from the perspective of Edgardo Díaz, the idea arose of producing a material that told the version of the Former members of Menudo.

The documentary, Menudo: Forever Young, directed by Puerto Rican, Angel Miguel Soto, premiered in June 2022 on the platform by HBOMax and revealed alleged cases of bullying, drug scandals, exploitative working conditions, neglect of boys' health, abuse, physical violence, harassment, sexual abuse, and even a rape allegedly experienced by Ângelo Garcia (member from 1988 to 1990) while he participated in Menudo.

See also
List of Menudo members
MDO
El Reencuentro

References

External links
Billboard.com: Menudo
  

1977 establishments in Puerto Rico
American boy bands
 
Vocal quintets
Latin pop music groups
Freestyle music groups
Child musical groups
Teen pop groups
Musical groups established in 1977
RCA Records artists
Sony Music artists
Universal Music Group artists
Puerto Rican boy bands